Philip Nobile (born 1942) is an American freelance writer, journalist, historian, teacher, and social critic/commentator. He has written or edited several books, published investigative journalism in leading newspapers and journals, and taught since 2001 at the Cobble Hill School of American Studies, a public school in Brooklyn.

Early life and education
Nobile was born in Boston. He studied as a seminarian and historian, but left religious life to become a journalist.

Career
During his journalism career, Nobile has written for The New York Press, New York Magazine, The Village Voice, The New York Review of Books, Harper's Magazine, Penthouse, Spin, Spy Magazine, Esquire, Newsday, The Weekly Standard, and The New York Post among other publications. He wrote on the idea of “positive incest” in a 1977 article on Warren Farrell in Penthouse that questioned the incest taboo.  He was an editor, along with Eric Nadler, of Penthouse Forum.  In addition he is a regular contributor to the online History News Network. As a "muckraking" investigative journalist and media analyst, Nobile has generated controversy by his criticisms of a variety of public figures, including sexologist Shere Hite, talk radio host Don Imus, historians Doris Kearns Goodwin and David McCullough, and President Harry S. Truman.

In 1982 he wrote in Penthouse Forum of his penis size research. He argued that data from Kinsey Institute studies showed that black penis were longer than white penises. This was based on a sample of 2376 "white college men", 143 "non-white college men" and 59 "black college men". In 1984 he was sued by Shere Hite for his Penthouse Forum editorial that said that she should be driven "out of the erogenous zones". The $15 million case was settled out of court, but Nobile did not issue an apology or retraction. In 1990 he debated Judith Reisman on the work of Alfred Kinsey in an appearance on The Phil Donahue Show where his writing on "positive incest" arose.

In 1990 he reported what was described as a "key story" in the Village Voice of a former altar boy's sexual relationship with the Rev. Bruce Ritter of Covenant House. This was part of an unfolding account of one of the earliest reported cases of sexual abuse among religious in institutional settings. None of the cases was prosecuted because of the 5-year statute of limitations at the time for sexual abuse.

In 1993, after the death of author Alex Haley, Nobile criticized his noted novel, Roots (1976), in an article in the Village Voice, calling it a "hoax" and suggesting his Pulitzer Prize should be rescinded. Clarence Page responded in the Chicago Tribune that Nobile was missing the point of the effect of Haley's work and noted that the author had always said parts were fiction. Page wrote, 
"I think he [Nobile] missed the larger, more important truth. If "Roots" was a hoax, it was a hoax Americans wanted desperately to believe, which says something more important about Americans than anything Nobile says about Haley."

His 2013 New York Post article asserted that President John Kennedy and Jackie Kennedy had sex on Air Force One on the day before his assassination. He based this report on a conversation he had with Kennedy biographer William Manchester, who did not want to be revealed as the source while he was alive. Nobile claimed that Jackie Kennedy Onassis suppressed publication of his book on the president's "Don Juanism" while she was an editor at Doubleday.

History teacher
Beginning in September 2001, Nobile has also taught history and political science for years at the Cobble Hill School Of American Studies, a public high school located in Brooklyn, managed by the New York City Department of Education.

Cobble Hill School controversy
In 2004, Nobile made allegation of what was termed a scandal that involved administrators' tampering with test and Regents examinations scores at the Cobble Hill School. As a result of Nobile's "whistleblowing," the Education Department assigned the case to Louis N. Scarcella, a retired police detective who then worked for the school system. In 2004 it published his 30-page report that alleged Theresa Capra, Cobble Hill School's assistant principal of humanities, had tampered with scores and the principal Lennel George had covered up. Capra resigned during the investigation and denied the allegations. George was reassigned.

In 2005, Richard J. Condon, the special commissioner of investigation for New York City schools, separately investigated the events at Cobble Hill. The result of his 23-month investigation was a 2007 report that, according to the New York Times, referred to Nobile as “a subpar teacher with poor evaluations who wrongly accused Ms. Capra of engineering a cheating scheme because she had given him a negative review that could have led to his firing.” (After the first investigation, he gained tenure.) The report blamed investigator Scarcella for producing a “deeply flawed report,” and being “biased and overtly influenced by Mr. Nobile.”, who was at the time the union chapter leader. Capra was reinstated in the New York public schools, and George was allowed to return to Cobble Hill.

Scarcella resigned his position after the 2007 report, and supervisory personnel in the investigation department also resigned. He maintained that his original 2005 report was accurate, stating, “All I can say is I stand by my investigation.…To this day, Mr. Nobile was correct about everything.”

Before the second report was published, earlier in 2007 Nobile had been reassigned to administrative duties related to an investigation of alleged corporal punishment of two students. Nobile responded to the allegations as being without cause. He described them “retaliatory” and a “smear” due to his whistleblowing in 2004.

In 2013 the New York Times reported on Louis Scarcella's earlier police work. It said that a man was released from prison after serving 20 years for a murder he did not commit. His 1990 conviction was overturned by the Brooklyn District Attorney after finding that Detective Scarcella had "coached" witnesses for the prosecution. In 2014, New York City overcame decades of resistance to appeals by the man, David Ranta, from the office of Brooklyn DA Charles Hynes agreed without a trial to a $6.4 million settlement in compensation. The Ranta settlement is "the first of what is expected to be a series of wrongful conviction claims by men who were sent to prison based on the flawed investigative work" of Scarcella.

Books
Nobile has written or edited eleven books, including 
Editor, Catholic Nonsense (1970)
The New Eroticism: Theories, Vogues and Canons,” (1970)The Con III Controversy: The Critics Look at the Greening of America (1971)Intellectual Skywriting: Literary Politics and the New York Review of Books (1974) King Cancer: The Good, the Bad, and the Cure of Cancer (1975)
with Eric David Nadler, United States of America vs. Sex: How the Meese Commission Lied About Pornography (1986)
with Edward Eichel, The Perfect Fit: How to Achieve Mutual Fulfillment and Monogamous Passion Through the New Intercourse (1992) 
Editor and Foreword, Judgement at the Smithsonian: The Bombing of Hiroshima and Nagasaki''(1995). The major part of the book was the full, original script of an exhibit planned by the Smithsonian for a 50th-anniversary exhibition related to the United States' atomic bombings in Japan during World War II. It included an Afterword by historian Barton Bernstein, who reviewed historical literature on the issue.(A political controversy arose, as some veterans objected to the Smithsonian's plan to present a balanced historical account, and the exhibit was cancelled.)

References

Living people
American male journalists
Schoolteachers from New York (state)
Writers from New York (state)
1942 births
Sex educators